Rhododendron 'President Roosevelt' is a popular cultivar of Rhododendron with striking variegated leaves and trusses of bright red flowers that fade to white in the centre. It is named after the 26th president of the United States, Theodore Roosevelt. Height 150–180 cm.

References

Salley, Homer E., & Greer, Harold E. Rhododendron Hybrids, 2nd Edition 1992. Timber Press. 

President Roosevelt
Ornamental plant cultivars